4E or 4e or 4-E may refer to:

People
Forrest J Ackerman or 4e (1916–2008), American science fiction fan and collector

Art, entertainment, and media
4E TV, a Greek TV station based in Thessaloniki
GURPS 4e Basic Set, an edition of the GURPS role-playing system
NJS4E (New Jack Swing For Ever), a company, network, events, and on-air programming honoring new jack swing
The 4th edition of Dungeons & Dragons, abbreviated as 4E
4E, the production code for the 1975 Doctor Who serial Genesis of the Daleks

Other uses
The "4E" view of cognition of the Extended mind thesis
4th meridian east, a longitude coordinate
Het 4e Gymnasium, a public gymnasium in the Netherlands
Potez 4E, a French air-cooled flat-four piston engine of the 1960s
Sedan 4E, a variation of the McCulloch MC-4 helicopter

See also
Douglas DC-4E, an American experimental airliner developed before World War II
E4 (disambiguation)
eIF4E, Eukaryotic translation initiation factor 4E, a protein